Peter Michael Clough (born 17 August 1956 in Sydney, New South Wales) was an Australian cricketer, who played for Tasmania and Western Australia.

He was a right-handed batsman and right arm fast-medium bowler who represented Tasmania from 1980 until 1984, and played for Western Australia until 1986.  He was a useful bowler, who could be relied upon for Tasmania, at time when the struggling state side was trying to establish itself as a competitive team. In 1984, Clough took the best bowling figures for Tasmania in the Sheffield Shield, a record that stood until March 2022.

His gritty bowling performances for Tasmania in the dark period of the early 1980s saw him added as a member of the state's elite Cricket Hall of Fame.

See also
 List of Tasmanian representative cricketers
 List of Western Australia first-class cricketers

References

External links
Cricinfo Profile

1956 births
Living people
Australian cricketers
Tasmania cricketers
Western Australia cricketers
Cricketers from Sydney